Mystery Men is a 1999 American superhero comedy film directed by Kinka Usher (in his feature-length directorial debut) and written by Neil Cuthbert, loosely based on Bob Burden's Flaming Carrot Comics, and starring Ben Stiller, Hank Azaria, William H. Macy, Greg Kinnear, Janeane Garofalo, Paul Reubens, Kel Mitchell, Wes Studi, Geoffrey Rush, Lena Olin, Eddie Izzard, Claire Forlani, and Tom Waits.

The film details the story of a team of lesser superheroes with unimpressive powers who are required to save the day. Mystery Men received generally positive reviews from critics, but was a box-office bomb, only making a little over $33 million worldwide against a $68 million budget.

Plot
In Champion City, the amateur superhero team of Mr. Furious, the Shoveler and the Blue Raja attempt to make a name for themselves, but their inexperience, infighting, and dubious abilities generally result in defeat and frustration. While trying to stop a robbery in progress, they are upstaged by the city's powerful and arrogant superhero, Captain Amazing. 

However, Amazing's crime fighting prowess has practically made his job obsolete. Without any worthy adversaries (most are either dead, in exile, or in jail), his corporate sponsors are beginning to withdraw support.

To create a need for his services, Amazing uses his alter ego, billionaire lawyer Lance Hunt, to argue for the release of his nemesis, supervillain Casanova Frankenstein, from an insane asylum. However, the plan backfires; once released and reunited with his henchman Tony P and his Disco Boys, Casanova Frankenstein blows up the asylum, easily outwits and captures Amazing, and prepares to unleash the "Psycho-frakulator", which lethally bends reality, on the city.

On a stakeout of Casanova Frankenstein's mansion, Mr. Furious observes Amazing's capture and informs his team. After an unsuccessful rescue attempt, the three realize that they need more allies. Through word-of-mouth and auditions they recruit Invisible Boy, the Spleen, and the Bowler. The emboldened team ambush Casanova's limousine, but merely succeed in annoying him. 

While drunk from celebrating their “victory,” the team is nearly killed in retaliation by Tony P and the Disco Boys. They are saved by the Sphinx, an enigmatic superhero who agrees to train them. The Sphinx's unconventional team-building exercises and antimetabole rhetoric annoy Mr. Furious, who quits the group, but the others flourish under his tutelage. Knowing that they will still be outgunned, the group seek out Doc Heller, who specializes in non-lethal weaponry, to equip them for their battle. Furious, encouraged by his new girlfriend, Monica, rejoins the team.

The team break into Casanova's mansion during a summit of several of the city's gangs; but, while attempting to free Captain Amazing, they inadvertently set off the Psycho-frakulator and kill him. Without Amazing, the team despairs of saving the city, but the Shoveler delivers a pep talk, which inspires them to continue. 

With new resolve, the team assaults the mansion again. This time, through a mix of surprise, teamwork, maximizing their quasi-superpowers, and Heller's quirky weapons, they subdue Casanova Frankenstein's henchmen. However, Casanova Frankenstein holds Monica hostage and activates the Psycho-frakulator, which begins to wreak havoc upon the city. While the team works to disable the device, Mr. Furious takes on Casanova Frankenstein, unleashes his inner rage and fights effectively for the first time. 

Mr. Furious throws Casanova Frankenstein into the core of the Psycho-frakulator which kills him with its reality-bending powers. The rest of the team helps The Bowler to destroy the device and escape the mansion as it implodes.

The team is swarmed by reporters who want to know the group's name. As they argue possible names among themselves, one reporter states, "Well, whatever you may call them, Champion City will forever owe a debt of gratitude to these 'Mystery Men'," but they are too busy arguing to hear it.

Cast

Additionally, Corbin Bleu and Philip Bolden appear as Butch and Roland, the Shoveler and Lucille's children. Television personality Riki Rachtman and filmmaker Michael Bay appear as part of the evil Frat Boys. Composer Mark Mothersbaugh appears as the band leader at the beginning of the film while a then unknown Sung Kang has a brief appearance. During the superhero auditions Dane Cook, Doug Jones and Dana Gould make cameo appearances as the Waffler, Pencilhead and Squeegeeman.

Production
In 1997, Mike Richardson, publisher of Dark Horse Comics, pitched the "Mystery Men" concept to producers Larry Gordon and Lloyd Levin at Universal. "My first impression was just how relatable the characters are," Levin said "Bob [Burden] has a real surrealistic sensibility, but at the core of his work is something that's thematically so identifiable. I think there is an almost childlike persistence of all the characters. And they ultimately hold on to the conviction that with courage and sacrifice, they can become what they dream."

The film was announced in mid-1997 along with a raft of comic book adaptations including Blade, Virus, Superman Lives, X-Men, The Fantastic Four, The Hulk, Captain America, The Sub-Mariner, Iron Man, Daredevil and Silver Surfer, Hellboy, Concrete, Green Hornet and 26 other titles.

That fall, Danny DeVito was in talks for a $13-million deal to both star and direct, but negotiations broke down over who would produce the soundtrack. "It was a big deal for me," DeVito said. "I really wanted it, so I walked away from the project." Ben Stiller was then approached to rewrite the script and direct but eventually turned it down. "I decided I didn't want to do it," he explained, "because it was just too much. It was a huge movie I'd be taking on."

Commercial director Kinka Usher was signed in April 1998 to direct. Usher had won awards for the "Got Milk?" and Taco Bell Chihuahua campaigns. Usher, who had been approached for other films, was discouraged when he saw the script for Mystery Men. "I thought it was boring," he said. "However, the premise was great." He continued, "Most of the movies made by commercial directors are heavy on visuals and thin on content. I don't want to be a part of that. I was very cognizant of showing that I know how to work with character."

Garofalo signed on and persuaded Stiller to appear in the film. "I met Kinka and he was nice and funny and the money was good, so I decided to do it," she said. "I had to twist Ben's arm because he's always so busy."

Stiller was originally offered the Blue Raja role, but was not interested in playing what he called a "nerdy guy" again. "The minute you start doing the same thing in comedy, people go, 'Oh, I've seen that,'" he said. He took the role of Mr. Furious but explained, "In the original script, he was just angry all the time, but I thought that would be boring, so one of the changes I made is that he has the least power. Like if we're a band, I'm the guy who started the band but who's also the least talented."

Geoffrey Rush was cast in what was his first Hollywood film in July, followed by Azaria, Reubens, Forlani and Macy. Lena Olin was added in August; Greg Kinnear in October; and Eddie Izzard in November. Others in consideration for roles included Ving Rhames and Vince Vaughn.

Reubens said, "I liked the idea. I hadn't seen it before. I loved the cast that was assembled by the time I came into it, and I thought the script was fun, smart and goofy all at the same time." Regarding his character, he said, "I felt I was playing the character as kind of slow, but when I saw the movie it didn't seem like that at all. I don't know what that says."

According to Stiller, the script was fluid. "The script was being reworked all the time by... everybody! Because everybody kind of wanted to personalize their part, and try to make it as funny as possible. So yeah, that was welcome. That was the idea we had going in, to just have everybody kind of get together and try to make it as funny as we could. Especially in the context of a big action, special effects type movie. You know, a lot of the time what gets lost is the specific character stuff, and the small moments that really have to work for the whole thing to work. So that's what we were concentrating on as much as possible. And it's good if everybody's on board with that, you know what I mean? And I think Hank, myself and Paul and Janeane were probably most involved in that process, for our characters. We're used to working that way."

Usher said, "We did a lot of unscripted stuff. I let Ben and Janeane go. They were totally free." Usher said he wanted "the film to look flat, like a comic book. I tried to capture that alternate reality but keep the edgy humor."

Shooting began on October 21, 1998, in Los Angeles, and was completed the following April. "I thought it would be quick, but it ended up being this six month shoot," Stiller recalled.

Bob Burden was on the set for some of the shoot, answering questions that came up about his creations. "There were times when we were kind of stumped in a scene and we asked him what he thought," Levin said. "The great thing about him is that 10 minutes later, we'd get 30 pages in the fax machine with probably 29 pages filled with the lousiest ideas that you've ever read but that one page of pure genius."

The original ending was unpopular with test audiences, so Usher shot a new one with what he called "a big-cheer finish."

Music
The musical score for Mystery Men was composed by Stephen Warbeck. Written within a 28-day time span, the score was recorded on the Sony Scoring Stage. "I was quite liberal in the choice of instruments, because I've chosen a couple of Hungarian instruments, the tárogató and the cimbalom, and also a Greek instrument, the bouzouki," said Warbeck on the film's range of sounds. "And then Mike Fisher and the other percussionists have brought along an exciting range of stuff which are so interesting and varied that we keep picking bits of those and adding them in." After Warbeck's contributions were completed, the film's producers decided to alter various scenes. Because of this, composer Shirley Walker was brought in to create additional music and rearrange Warbeck's score to fit the new running time.

A soundtrack album was released on July 6, 1999, by Interscope Records.

Additional songs featured in the film include:
 "Planet Claire" – The B-52s
 "O Mio Babbino Caro" (Composed by Giacomo Puccini) – Miriam Gauci
 "Play That Funky Music" – Wild Cherry
 "A Fifth of Beethoven" - Walter Murphy and the Big Apple Band

Release

Box office

Universal delayed the film's release one week to avoid competing with the opening of The Blair Witch Project. In its opening weekend, Mystery Men grossed $10,017,865, ranking number six at the domestic box office. By the end of its run, on October 14, the film had grossed $29,762,011 domestically and $3,699,000 internationally, for a worldwide total of $33,461,011. Given its $68 million budget, the film is a box office bomb.

Critical response

Review aggregator site Rotten Tomatoes gives the film a score of 61% based on 104 reviews, with an average rating of 5.80/10. The site's consensus states: "Absurd characters and quirky gags are brought to life by a talented cast, providing this superhero spoof with lots of laughs." On Metacritic, the film has a 65 out of 100 rating based on reviews from 24 critics, indicating "generally favorable reviews". Audiences polled by CinemaScore gave the film an average grade of "C+" on an A+ to F scale.

Godfrey Cheshire for Variety thought the film "may contain more yuks than the summer's other big pop sendup, the second 'Austin Powers,' but it also spreads them over an ultimately tiresome two hours...Though pic boasts several action sequences that are expertly handled and laden with dazzling effects, its most engaging passages by far are the ones focusing on the central sextets' banter and interaction." Kenneth Turan of the Los Angeles Times wrote, "Watching 'Mystery Men' is a bit like sitting next to a brilliant person at a dinner party who just won't shut up. Because this film is so self-conscious and, like Mr. Furious and friends, has a tendency to try too hard, it's an effort you end up admiring more than completely loving. Influenced by its betters, films such as Brazil, Buckaroo Banzai and even Blade Runner, it's destined to join them all in cult film heaven."

Jonathan Romney for Sight & Sound said that it was "a desperately hit-and-miss affair". Michael Dequina of The Movie Report said that it "fails to come up with worthy gags and one-liners for the able cast." Steve Murray of Cox News Service gave it a negative review, saying "Mystery Men is like its hapless heroes. It's a wannabe that has the best intentions – including a pronounced anti-gun stance – but none of the knack it takes to save the day, or itself."

Newsday wrote, "'Mystery Men' manages to exalt both the terminally weird and the frighteningly mundane with such flamboyant good spirits that you overlook its occasional dead zones and dull patches. Try as it might to prop up its static plot, the movie is more comic revue than action comedy. Viewed within these parameters, 'Mystery Men' is as satisfying as a heaping helping of Abbott-and-Costello shorts. And much smarter than the average doofus blockbuster." British television channel Film4 gave the film 3.5 out of 5 stars, saying it was "Hugely entertaining – especially for those with a thing for superheroes."

References

External links

 
 
 
 
 
 

1999 films
1999 action comedy films
1990s superhero comedy films
American action comedy films
American superhero films
1990s English-language films
Films based on Dark Horse Comics
Films set in California
Films shot in Los Angeles
Universal Pictures films
Dark Horse Entertainment films
Films scored by Stephen Warbeck
Films based on Image Comics
1999 directorial debut films
1999 comedy films
1990s American films